Color is a population health technology company which provides genetic tests and analysis directly to patients as well as through employers. The product focuses on genes that indicate risk for heart disease, cancer, and that affect medication response.

History 

The company was co-founded in 2015 by Elad Gil, Nish Bhat, Taylor Sittler, and Othman Laraki, who now serves as company CEO, in Burlingame, California.

In November of 2021, the company had a valuation of $4.6B and collected $100 million in a series E financing round.

Expansion to Population Health 
Color provides technology, software, and clinical services for population health programs.

Color has partnered with health systems including NorthShore University Health System, Ochsner Health System, and Jefferson Health.

COVID-19 Testing Programs 

In early 2020, recognizing the growing threat that the COVID-19 pandemic presented, Color mobilized its existing software, logistics expertise and lab operations to focus on mass COVID-19 testing.

Color operates a high-throughput CLIA-certified COVID-19 testing laboratory and processes thousands of samples a day. The integrated process includes sign up, the self-collection kit, and results returned via text and email to patients, clinicians, and public health authorities. Color returns results, on average, within 24–48 hours.

In August of 2020, Color was running some of the highest-capacity test sites in the country. Color was also responsible for the majority of San Francisco’s COVID-19 testing with an average turnaround time within 24 hours, and most results returned in under 48 hours. Color worked with San Francisco’s CityTestSF program, Alameda County Health Services and federally qualified health centers in Alameda County, Marin County and others. The company has also partnered with a wide variety of universities, employers and public health entities, including USC and United Airlines.

In January of 2022, Color had computer difficulties that resulted in delayed test results and closed testing stations.

Testing System

Genetics 
Color’s physician-ordered test can be initiated by individuals online, and a sample collection kit is sent in the mail. Individuals provide a saliva sample and return the kit in a pre-paid package. Color's CLIA-certified and CAP-approved lab analyzes for variants in the breast cancer genes BRCA1 and BRCA2, as well as 28 other genes associated with breast, prostate, colon, uterine, stomach, melanoma, pancreatic, and ovarian cancers. The test also identifies variants in 30 genes related to hereditary heart conditions as well as genes that may impact medication response. Genetic counseling with board-certified genetic counselors is available for free to all individuals who use Color.

COVID-19 
Color’s FDA Emergency Use Authorization (EUA) COVID-19 test can be accessed as a part of testing programs initiated by a public health entity, university, employer or other organization. The test is a dry anterior nasal swab, approved for use either in an on-site or at-home setting without the need for a healthcare provider to monitor sample collection, which eases the burden on the healthcare system and reduces testing costs.

The company has received an FDA EUA for the testing assay, which is a nucleic acid amplification method called LAMP, or loop-mediated isothermal amplification. This enables processing test results 50% faster than RT-PCR, the amplification method used at most other labs. LAMP relies on a different set of chemical reagents than standard PCR tests, which helps the process avoids supply chain scarcity.

Research 
In 2018, Color was selected, alongside the Broad Institute of MIT and Harvard, and the Laboratory for Molecular Medicine (LMM) at Partners HealthCare, to establish one of three genome centers around the country for the National Institutes of Health’s historic All of Us Research Program. All of Us will sequence one million or more people across the US, with the goal of accelerating health research and enabling individualized prevention, treatment, and care. The program has a focus on recruitment from populations that have been historically underrepresented in clinical science and genomic medicine, in order to build a diverse biomedical data resource that provides a foundation for better insights into the biological, environmental, and behavioral factors that influence health.

In 2019, Color was named the sole awardee to deliver all of the genetic counseling for All of Us. As the awardee, Color will customize software and tools to integrate data from all the genome centers, standardize reporting across the program, and ensure all results are returned in a unified way. This is a first year $4.6 million grant as part of a multi-year $25 million project.

In collaboration with the Women’s Health Initiative and Dr. Mary-Claire King at the University of Washington, Color provided genetic sequencing for the cohort of 10,000 Fabulous Ladies Over Seventy (FLOSSIES). This is the largest publicly available dataset of genetic variants associated with hereditary cancer in healthy, older individuals.

Color Data, a database containing aggregated genetic and clinical information from 50,000 individuals who took a Color test, helps researchers and scientists identify genotype-phenotype correlations and novel variants for functional analysis, as well as enables data-driven drug discovery and development. It is the largest public database of its kind.

As a part of the MAGENTA Study, which aims to improve availability of genetic testing for hereditary cancer syndromes to at-risk individuals through the use of an online genetic testing service, Color is working with a Stand Up to Cancer Dream Team that includes physicians, scientists and researchers from the MD Anderson Cancer Center and the University of Washington to provide genetic counseling to high-risk individuals through delivery models such as tele-counseling.

In collaboration with Dr. Laura Esserman at University of California and Sanford Health, Color is providing genetic testing for WISDOM, a 100,000-woman study that is comparing annual screenings with personalized, risk-based breast cancer screenings.

As part of the GENtleMEN Study, Color is working with Dr. Heather Cheng at the Fred Hutchinson Cancer Research Center and the University of Washington to provide genetic testing and counseling to men with advanced prostate cancer.

Color contributes anonymized variants to ClinVar, a free database managed by the National Center for Biotechnology Information (NCBI) at the National Institutes of Health (NIH) that helps researchers identify links between genes and disease.

Color’s research collaborators include:

 Mary-Claire King: Advisor, Scientific Collaborator
 Sekar Kathiresan: Advisor, Scientific Collaborator
 Heidi Rehm: Scientific Collaborator

References

Genomics companies
Genetics
Medical tests
Biotechnology
Cancer research